Milton Theodore Okun (December 23, 1923 – November 15, 2016) was an American arranger, record producer, conductor, singer and founder of Cherry Lane Music Publishing Company, Inc. Okun transformed the careers of a dozen or more major U.S. artists who under Okun's tutelage became some of the most successful musical acts of the 1950s, 1960s, and 1970s. A special on PBS alludes to Okun as one of the most influential music producers in history. His career lasted over 50 years, from the folk revival to the twenty-first century.

He created arrangements or produced for many popular groups and artists such as Peter, Paul and Mary; The Chad Mitchell Trio; The Brothers Four; John Denver; and Miriam Makeba. In 1968 he interviewed many American folksingers and published the songs they chose in Something to Sing About!

At the height of Okun's career, a critic wrote, "Of all producers, Milton Okun's range is the widest, from Plácido Domingo to the Muppets." Conductor for Harry Belafonte, arranger and producer of Peter, Paul and Mary, the man who brought John Denver to stardom and produced his most loved hits, Okun also founded Cherry Lane Music, the music publishing company for Elvis and DreamWorks among many other household names.

Okun died on November 15, 2016, at the age of 92.

Honors 
In 2008, Okun won the Abe Olman Publisher Award at the Songwriters Hall of Fame ceremony. Milton T. Okun published his memoir, Along the Cherry Lane, on June 13, 2011.

Discography
Okun was part of the folk quartet The Skifflers and also recorded several albums of his own in the 1950s.

Natural Acoustic band (1971) learning to live and Branching in RCA Every Inch a Sailor (Stinson SLP65) 	
I Sing of Canada  (Stinson SLP71)
Adirondack Folk Songs And Ballads (Stinson SLP82)
America's Best Loved Folk Songs (Baton BL 1203/Warwick 2011)
Merry Ditties (Riverside RLP 12-603)	
(with Ellen Stekert) Traditional American Love Songs (Riverside RLP 12-634) 
Goin’ Down to Town (Epic) by The Skifflers; later edited and re-released as Hootenanny with the Skifflers (Columbia HL7307) and Folk Songs (Perfect Records)
Everybody Sing! Volume 3 – Songs for Seniors (Riverside RLP 1420)

Books
1968: Something to Sing About: the personal choices of America's folk singers. New York: Macmillan Company 
New York Times Great Songs of the Sixties (as editor)
New York Times Great Songs of ABBA (as editor)
Great Songs of the Seventies (as editor)
New York Times Great Songs of Lennon and McCartney (as editor; also wrote introduction)
The Compleat Beatles (as editor)
Twin Peaks (as editor)
Along the Cherry Lane: Tales from the life of the music industry legend, producer, arranger, and publisher Milton Okun (as told to Richard Sparks) – 2011
 *Review by What Is That Book About?
 *Review by BookHounds

References

External links

Milton Okun interview via Charlie Rose
Milt Okun via Cherry Lane Music Publishing Co., Inc.
Milt Okun interview via Artistshouse Music
Milt Okun Interview NAMM Oral History Program (2006)

1923 births
2016 deaths
American conductors (music)
American male conductors (music)
American music arrangers
Record producers from New York (state)
21st-century American memoirists
Jewish American musicians
John Denver
Musicians from Brooklyn
New York University alumni
Oberlin College alumni
Singers from New York City